Salt mining extracts natural salt deposits from underground. The mined salt is usually in the form of halite (commonly known as rock salt), and extracted from evaporite formations.

History 

Before the advent of the modern internal combustion engine and earth-moving equipment, mining salt was one of the most expensive and dangerous of operations because of rapid dehydration caused by constant contact with the salt (both in the mine passages and scattered in the air as salt dust) and of other problems caused by accidental excessive sodium intake. Salt is now plentiful, but until the Industrial Revolution, it was difficult to come by, and salt was often mined by slaves or prisoners. Life expectancy for the miners was low.

Ancient China was among the earliest civilizations in the world with cultivation and trade in mined salt. They first discovered natural gas when they excavated rock salt. The Chinese writer, poet, and politician Zhang Hua of the Jin dynasty wrote in his book Bowuzhi how people in Zigong, Sichuan, excavated natural gas and used it to boil a rock salt solution. The ancient Chinese gradually mastered and advanced the techniques of producing salt. Salt mining was an arduous task for them, as they faced geographical and technological constraints. Salt was extracted mainly from the sea, and salt works in the coastal areas in late imperial China equated to more than 80 percent of national production. The Chinese made use of natural crystallization of salt lakes and constructed some artificial evaporation basins close to shore. In 1041, during the Song dynasty, a well with a diameter about the size of a bowl and several dozen feet deep was drilled for salt production. As salt is a necessity of life, salt mining played a pivotal role as one of the most important sources of the Imperial Chinese government's revenue and state development.

Most modern salt mines are privately operated or operated by large multinational companies such as K+S, AkzoNobel, Cargill, and Compass Minerals.

Mining regions around the world 

Some notable salt mines include:

Idiomatic use 
In slang, the term , and especially the phrase , refers ironically to one's workplace, or a dull or tedious task.

See also 
 Salt mines

Khewra
Schacht Asse II
Turda
Wieliczka
Windsor
 General
Salt evaporation pond
Brine mining
Injection well
Salt lake
Salt dome
Miner

References

External links 

Mohammedia Rock Salt Company

 
Ancient Roman technology
Chinese inventions
Mining